Sören Benn (born 8 August 1968) is a German politician and since 2016 'Bezirksbürgermeister' (district mayor) of the Berlin borough of Pankow.

Life and politics

Benn was born 1968 in the East German town of Kyritz and studied pedagogy.
Benn entered the socialist Left Party in 2000 and became Bezirksbürgermeister of Pankow in 2016.

References 

Living people
1968 births
The Left (Germany) politicians
21st-century German politicians
People from Kyritz